Mohammed or Mohammad Salim may refer to:

 Mohammad Salim (born 1981), Bangladeshi cricketer
 Mohammed Salim (footballer) (1904–1980), Indian footballer
 Mohammed Salim (politician) (born 1957), Indian politician
 Mohammad Salim Al-Awa (born 1942), Egyptian Islamist thinker
 Mohammed Ali Salim, Libyan politician active in 2012
 Ramadhan Mohammed Salim (born 1993), Kenyan footballer

See also
 Mohammad Selim (died 2015), Bangladeshi politician
 Salim Mohammed (born 1946), Trinidad cyclist